Jivevaneng (also spelled Jivewaneng or Zivewaneng) is a town located on the Huon Peninsula, in Kotte Rural LLG, Morobe Province, Papua New Guinea.

References

Populated places in Morobe Province